Julien Quesne (born 16 August 1980) is a French professional golfer who plays on the European Tour.

Early life and career

Quesne was born in Le Mans. He turned professional in 2003 and joined the Alps Tour. He gained a place on the second tier Challenge Tour for 2005 by reaching the final stage of the European Tour Qualifying School at the end of 2004. He has played on the tour since then, except for 2007 when he returned to the Alps Tour for a season. That season, he won three tournaments and topped the Alps Tour Order of Merit to graduate back to the Challenge Tour for the 2008 season.

Quesne picked up his first victory on the Challenge Tour at the 2009 Trophée du Golf de Genève in Switzerland on his 29th birthday. He began the final round one stroke behind Edoardo Molinari but his final round of 66 (6 under par) saw him finish one stroke clear of the Italian.

Quesne won his first European Tour event at the Open de Andalucía Costa del Sol in 2012. Prior to his win, Quesne was ranked 322nd in the world and never finished higher than 16th on the European Tour. In September 2013, Quesne claimed his second European Tour victory at the Italian Open. He finished one shot in front of David Higgins and Steve Webster.

Professional wins (8)

European Tour wins (2)

Challenge Tour wins (2)

Alps Tour wins (4)

Results in World Golf Championships

"T" = Tied

See also
2009 Challenge Tour graduates
2011 Challenge Tour graduates

References

External links
 

French male golfers
European Tour golfers
Olympic golfers of France
Golfers at the 2016 Summer Olympics
Sportspeople from Le Mans
Sportspeople from Tours, France
1980 births
Living people
21st-century French people